Calliope was the name of at least two ships of the Italian Navy and may refer to:

 , a  launched in 1906 and discarded in 1924.
 , a  launched in 1938 and stricken in 1958.

Italian Navy ship names